Anstiss is a surname. Notable people with the surname include:

Harry Anstiss (1899–1964), English footballer
Jessica Anstiss (born 1996), Australian netball player

See also
 Anstis